The Kent and Dollar Farm massacres were one of the earliest massacres carried out by the LTTE during the Sri Lankan Civil War. The massacres took place on 30 November 1984, in two tiny farming villages in the district of Mullaitivu in north-eastern Sri Lanka. The Sri Lankan government labeled this as an attack on civilians by the LTTE.

Backdrop to the events

The Kent and Dollar farms were located near Manal Aru a divisional Secretariat in the Tamil district of Mullaitivu. Manal Aru was of immense importance since it was situated on the border of three districts Mullaitivu, Trincomalee and Anuradhapura and more importantly was the sole gateway between the North and the Eastern parts of the island where the Tamil community was the majority.
 
Realising its strategic importance and in a bid to quell the rising threat of Tamil Nationalism, Manal Aru was renamed as Weli Oya (Sinhalese translation of the Tamil name) and an attempt was sought to colonise the area, with Sinhalese.

In November 1984, Sinhalese convicts were settled in the Kent and Dollar farms after the Tamil civilians living there were evicted by the Sri Lankan Army. The settlement of prisoners was used to further harass Tamils into leaving the area. The Sinhala settlers confirmed that young Tamil women were abducted, brought there and gang-raped, first by the forces, next by prison guards and finally by prisoners.

A total of 13,288 Tamil families living in 42 villages for generations including Kokkulai Grama Sevakar Division (1,516 Tamil families), Kokku–Thoduvai Grama Sevakar Division (3,306 Tamil families), Vavuniya North Grama Sevakar Division (1,342 Tamil families), other Divisions of Mullaitivu District including Naiyaru and Kumulamunai (2,011 Tamil families) were asked to vacate their homes and farmlands within 48 hours. Simultaneously land given to fourteen Tamil entrepreneurs, including the Kent and Dollar Farms on 99 years lease, were cancelled by the government.

Among the Sinhala families later settled included those of Sinhalese ex-convicts who had served time for minor crimes like illegal alcohol brewing, thuggery, and intimidation.

From 1988 to 1989 Sinhalese villages in Weli Oya was put on a war-footing. A total of 3,364 families, most of them landless peasants, were settled in Weli Oya. A further 35,000 persons comprising 5,925 families were also settled under the same scheme.

Attack by the LTTE

About 50 LTTE cadres travelled in the night in two buses armed with rifles, machine guns and grenades. One of the buses went to Dollar Farm and the other to Kent Farm. The attacks was timed to start at about the same time in the early hours of the morning. The LTTE fighters shot and killed the guards, the women and children and most of the male members of the families. Some of the prisoners were thrust into a room in a building and blasted with explosives. 62 Sinhalese; including 3 jail-guards, 31 women and 21 children were killed. The second bus proceeded to the Kent Farm 8 kilometres away and killed 20 more home guards. The police and the troops conducted a cordon and search operation and the government announced that the troops had killed 30 militants.

Casualties
The death toll of Sinhalese civilians killed by the LTTE attack numbered 65 Sinhalese villagers; including 3 jail-guards, 31 women and 21 children were killed . The second bus that proceeded to Kent Farm killed 20 more home guards.

References
 
 Gunaratna, Rohan. (1998). Sri Lanka's Ethnic Crisis and National Security, Colombo: South Asian Network on Conflict Research. 
 Gunaratna, Rohan. (1 October 1987). War and Peace in Sri Lanka: With a Post-Accord Report From Jaffna, Sri Lanka: Institute of Fundamental Studies. 
 Gunasekara, S.L. (4 November 2003). The Wages of Sin,

Further reading 
 Suicide terrorism: a global threat, Security, Jane's, 20 October 2000
 Kent Farm and Dollar Farm massacre; Pictures of murdered civilians, Lanka Library, 11 June 2006
 LTTE Tamil Tiger Atrocities, 2002

1984 crimes in Sri Lanka
Massacres in 1984
Attacks on civilians attributed to the Liberation Tigers of Tamil Eelam
Massacres in Sri Lanka
Liberation Tigers of Tamil Eelam attacks in Eelam War I
Mass murder of Sinhalese
Terrorist incidents in Sri Lanka in 1984
November 1984 events in Asia